Peristarium timor is a species of large sea snail, marine gastropod mollusk in the family Turbinellidae.

Description

Distribution

References

Turbinellidae
Fauna of Timor
Gastropods described in 1983